Elizabeth Fremantle (born 1962) is an English novelist and teacher of Creative Writing, whose published works include Queens Gambit, The Girl in the Glass Tower (2016) and Queen's Gambit (2013). As EC Fremantle she has published the critically acclaimed thriller The Poison Bed (2018). Elizabeth's novels focus on themes of women and power and are linked by her interest in exploring the invisibility of early modern women's lives. She was described by The Bookseller in 2013 as ‘a major new voice in historical fiction,’ and People Magazine called her ‘a brilliant new player in the court of royal fiction.’ Fremantle is the 5x great-granddaughter of diarist Elizabeth Wynne Fremantle and Thomas Fremantle (Royal Navy officer), the latter of whom was a close associate of Horatio Nelson.

Early life 
Elizabeth Fremantle was born in London and spent her early years in Hampstead, North London. (Fremantle was known as 'Cecilia Fremantle' until aged 11.)

Early career 
After leaving school aged sixteen Fremantle worked in a variety of jobs before embarking on a career in journalism as a fashion editor for ELLE UK followed by British Vogue and then in France for Vogue Paris.

In the 1990s she attended Birkbeck, University of London as a mature student gaining a 1st class BA in English Literature and the Prize for English, followed by a masters in Creative Writing.

Literary career 
Since finishing her creative writing masters at Birkbeck Fremantle has published five Tudor and Jacobean set novels with Michael Joseph, an imprint of Penguin Random House UK. Her first three novels are also published by Simon & Schuster in the United States.

Her first novel, Queen’s Gambit, focuses on the life of Henry VIII of England's last wife, Catherine Parr. Film rights have been acquired by Baby Cow Productions and a feature film is in development. Her second novel, Sisters of Treason, explores the story of the younger sisters of Lady Jane Grey and her third Watch the Lady tells of Penelope Devereux (Penelope Blount, Countess of Devonshire) – sister of the doomed Earl of Essex (Robert Devereux) who was labelled by James I of England ‘a fair woman with a black soul.’ Her fourth novel, The Girl in the Glass Tower is about Lady Arbella Stuart, who was for a time the presumed heir to Elizabeth I of England. Her fifth novel, a Jacobean psychological thriller, The Poison Bed, was published in 2018 under the name EC Fremantle. Her work has been translated into ten languages.

She is a committee member the Historical Writers’ Association and was co-founder of their online magazine Historia. She has also had work published in various other publications including Vanity Fair, The Sunday Times, The Wall Street Journal and the Financial Times and occasionally reviews fiction for the Sunday Express. Elizabeth Fremantle chaired the judging panel for the HWA Gold Crown 2018, an award for the best historical novel of the year.

A feature film of Queen's Gambit is in pre-production, to be directed by Karim Aïnouz and produced by Gabrielle Tana at Magnolia Mae productions.

List of works 
 The Honey and the Sting (2020)  
 The Poison Bed (2018)  
 The Girl in the Glass Tower (2016) 
 Watch the Lady (2015) 
 Sisters of Treason (2014) 
 Queen's Gambit (2013)

External links 
 Fremantle's website
 Fremantle's author profile on Penguin

1962 births
English women novelists
Living people